AZD-1940 is a drug developed by AstraZeneca, that is a peripherally selective cannabinoid agonist which binds with high affinity to both the CB1 and CB2 receptors. It was developed for the treatment of neuropathic pain, but while it showed good peripheral selectivity in animal studies, in human clinical trials it failed to show sufficient analgesic efficacy and produced unexpectedly strong side effects associated with central cannabinoid activity, and so was discontinued from further development.

See also 
 AZ-11713908
 2F-QMPSB
 RQ-00202730

References 

Cannabinoids
Benzimidazoles
Tert-butyl compounds
Sulfonamides
Peripherally selective drugs
Experimental drugs